Import surtaxes, also known as special tariffs, are extra taxes on top of the normal import tax of imported goods, with the extra taxes being reserved for some purposes. They are different from import duty, which is not reflected in the customs tariff and is set for a specific purpose. Often, they depend on their level of taxation, which is the specific purpose for their collection. They are usually temporary or one-off.

Purposes 
To meet the balance of payments crisis to maintain balance between imports and exports. The United States happens the first trade deficit in 1970’s. The Nixon administration implemented, to meet the balance of payments crisis, the "new economic policy" and announced a levy of foreign imports of 10% of all import surcharges;

 To revent dumping of foreign goods.

 As a tool for discrimination against a particular country or for retaliation.

Forms 
Five types of punishment are anti-dumping duties, countervailing duties, emergency duties, regular tariffs and retaliatory tariffs.

Customs duties
Import